The 2015–16 Western Michigan Broncos men's basketball team represented Western Michigan University (WMU) during the 2015–16 NCAA Division I men's basketball season. The Broncos, led by 13th year head coach Steve Hawkins, played their home games at University Arena as members of the West Division of the Mid-American Conference (MAC). They finished the season 13–19 overall and 7–11 in MAC play to finish in last place in the West Division. They lost in the first round of the MAC tournament to Northern Illinois. WMU tied Eastern Michigan for the Michigan MAC Trophy with a 3–1 record. However, due to not having a clear winner, Central Michigan retained the trophy that they won in 2014–15.

Previous season
The Broncos finished the season 20–14 (10–8 in the MAC) to finish in third place in the West Division. They advanced to the second round of the MAC tournament where they lost to Akron. They were invited to the CollegeInsider.com Tournament where they lost in the first round to Cleveland State.

Departures

Recruiting class of 2015

Recruiting class of 2016

Roster

Schedule

|-
! colspan="9" style="background:#6a3e0f; color:#e3bc85;"| Exhibition

|-
! colspan="9" style="background:#6a3e0f; color:#e3bc85;"| Non-conference regular season

|-
! colspan="9" style="background:#6a3e0f; color:#e3bc85;"| MAC regular season

|-
! colspan="9" style="background:#6a3e0f; color:#e3bc85;"| MAC tournament

References

Western Michigan Broncos men's basketball seasons
Western Michigan